is a railway station on the Shinano Railway Line in the city of Chikuma, Nagano, Japan, operated by the third-sector railway operating company Shinano Railway.

Lines
Togura Station is served by the Shinano Railway Line and is 54.9 kilometers from the starting point of the line at Karuizawa Station.

Station layout
The station consists of one ground-level island platform and one side platform serving three tracks, connected to the station building by a footbridge. The station is staffed.

Platforms

Adjacent stations

History
Togura Station opened on 11 February 1912.

Passenger statistics
In fiscal 2011, the station was used by an average of 2,650 passengers daily.

Surrounding area
Togura Kamiyamada Onsen

See also
List of railway stations in Japan

References

External links

  

Railway stations in Japan opened in 1912
Railway stations in Nagano Prefecture
Shinano Railway Line
Chikuma, Nagano